Buddy the Beefalo is a beefalo (a hybrid of a cow and a bison) who became notable for his August 2020 escape from a slaughterhouse in Connecticut. Buddy evaded all attempts at capture for eight months, until the Plymouth police department successfully captured Buddy in April 2021. After his capture, Buddy was transported to Massachusetts for a medical evaluation before traveling to Critter Creek Farm Sanctuary in Florida.

References 

Individual animals in the United States
Missing or escaped animals
Individual cows